Sir William Abbott Herdman FRS FRSE FLS (5 September 1858, Edinburgh – 21 July 1924) was a Scottish marine zoologist and oceanographer.

His zoological author abbreviation is Herdman.

Life

He was born in Edinburgh the son of the artist Robert Herdman RSA and his wife, Emma Abbott. They lived at 32 Danube Street. He was educated at Edinburgh Academy from 1870 to 1875.

Archibald Geikie taught him geology during his time at the University of Edinburgh. Herdman graduated BSc in 1879 and became the assistant of Sir Charles Wyville Thomson. In this capacity he was placed as Secretary to the Challenger Expedition Commission: overseeing the deciphering of the huge catalogue of information found during this important exploration.

In 1880, he became Demonstrator of Zoology at the University of Edinburgh and then, in 1881, the first holder of the Derby Chair of Natural History at Liverpool University College (later to become the University of Liverpool). In 1881 he was elected a Fellow of the Royal Society of Edinburgh. His proposers were Sir Charles Wyville Thomson, Sir William Turner, Sir Archibald Geikie and Sir John Murray. He won the Society's Neill Prize for the period 1880–1883.

In 1890, he founded the research station at Puffin Island off the north Wales coast, appointing Philip Jacob White as its Director.

He devoted himself from 1891 to the organization of a laboratory for study of the sea. He endowed the Herdman chair of geology in 1916 and then a chair of Oceanography in 1919. He was the author of Founders of Oceanography and Their Work: An Introduction to the Science of the Sea  (1923) and made many contribution to the scientific study of the fauna of the Irish Sea. He was interested in fisheries and studied, in 1901-1902, the harvesting of pearls in Ceylon. He was a specialist in tunicates.

Herdman was elected a Fellow of the Royal Society in 1892. He served as president of the Linnean Society from 1904 to 1908. He was the president of the British Association for 1919–1920. He was knighted in 1922.

Death
He died in London on 21 July 1924. He is buried in the eastern section of Highgate Cemetery.

Family

He married twice: firstly in 1882 to Sarah Wyse Douglas (1861-1886), daughter of David Douglas, publisher and bookseller, and secondly in 1893 to Jane Brandreth Holt (1867–1922), daughter of the shipping merchant Alfred Holt.

References

External links 
 
 Isle of Man biography page
 

1858 births
1924 deaths
Scientists from Edinburgh
Alumni of the University of Edinburgh
Scottish zoologists
Scottish oceanographers
Scottish marine biologists
Scottish geologists
Scottish archaeologists
Academics of the University of Liverpool
Presidents of the British Science Association
Presidents of the Linnean Society of London
Fellows of the Royal Society
Burials at Highgate Cemetery
Marine zoologists
Scottish knights
Knights Bachelor
Fellows of the Royal Society of Edinburgh